Mammillaria marksiana is a cactus in the genus Mammillaria of the family Cactaceae.

Description
Mammillaria marksiana is a perennial, green, fleshy and globose plant, with leaves transformed into thorns. With age it becomes slightly column-shaped and begins to shoots. The tubercles are pyramidal, approximately four-sided. Radial and central spines are variable in number from 4 to 21. They are thin, needle-shaped, golden-yellow to brown,  in length. The blooming area is usually covered by snow-white wool. The funnel-shaped flowers are green or lemon-yellow and reach a size of about 1.5 cm. Flowering period in Europe extends from late winter to early spring. The fruits are dark-purple, club-shaped, up to 2 inches long and contain small brown seeds.

Distribution
This species is endemic to western Mexico (states of Durango, Chihuahua, Sonora and Sinaloa).

Habitat
This cactus has spread throughout the world as an ornamental plant.

References
 
 The International Plant Name Index
 Cacti Guide
 Mammillaria.net
 Cactus-art

marksiana
Cacti of Mexico
Plants described in 1948